The women's 200 metres event at the 2000 World Junior Championships in Athletics was held in Santiago, Chile, at Estadio Nacional Julio Martínez Prádanos on 19, 20 and 21 October.

Medalists

Results

Final
21 October
Wind: +0.7 m/s

Semifinals
20 October

Semifinal 1
Wind: -2.1 m/s

Semifinal 2
Wind: +1.6 m/s

Quarterfinals
19 October

Quarterfinal 1
Wind: 0.0 m/s

Quarterfinal 2
Wind: -1.0 m/s

Quarterfinal 3
Wind: -1.4 m/s

Heats
19 October

Heat 1
Wind: +1.0 m/s

Heat 2
Wind: -0.5 m/s

Heat 3
Wind: -1.2 m/s

Heat 4
Wind: -0.4 m/s

Heat 5
Wind: -2.1 m/s

Participation
According to an unofficial count, 33 athletes from 26 countries participated in the event.

References

200 metres
200 metres at the World Athletics U20 Championships